Amsterdamsche Droogdok Maatschappij (ADM) was a Dutch company that repaired ships using dry docks in Amsterdam, Netherlands. After World War II it also built some ships.

Context

Port of Amsterdam 
By the early 19th century the once famous commercial center Amsterdam had a very poor connection to the sea. The situation improved by the construction of the Noordhollandsch Kanaal, completed  in 1824. It soon turned out that by itself, the canal did not create a suitable port for Amsterdam. This was done by creating the wet docks Oosterdok and Westerdok. Outside of these docks, docking was hindered by tides and other inconveniences. Inside these docks, the 'Rederij der Drijvende Droogdokken' (floating dry docks shipping line) built three wooden floating dry docks in the 1840s. The first of these, Amsterdam Wooden Drydock I can be considered to have been the first modern floating dry dock in Europe.

The North Sea Canal 
By the 1850s it was clear that Amsterdam needed a more direct connection to the North Sea. This would lead to the construction of the North Sea Canal, opened in November 1876. The new canal had a lock that could service ships of 120 m by 18 m and with a draft of 8 m. The canal only reached the first required depth of 6.5 m in October 1878. Meanwhile the IJ Bay was closed off by a dam east of Amsterdam.

It all meant that larger ships could reach Amsterdam. These could not (easily) reach, and would not fit the existing dry docks. Meanwhile the closure of the IJ had created new possible locations for (floating) dry docks, while the existing ones were locked up in the old wet docks.

Foundation of ADM

Stoomvaart Maatschappij Nederland 
Stoomvaart Maatschappij Nederland (SMN) was a shipping line founded in 1870. Its goal was to operate a regular service to the Dutch East Indies with steamships via the Suez Canal. To do this it bought four very large ships, e.g. SS Willem III. These did not fit the Noordhollandsch Kanaal, and therefore the company had to operate from Nieuwediep. SMN wanted to operate from Amsterdam as soon as the North Sea Canal was deep enough. However, at Nieuwediep the navy base Willemsoord had a dry dock which was suitable for the SMN ships, and which the navy made available to help SMN. When the opening of the North Sea Canal became imminent, the board of SMN asked its shareholders for permission to participate in a company to establish a suitable dry dock in Amsterdam. In the general shareholders meeting of 4 May 1875, this permission was granted for up to 500,000 guilders.

ADM is founded 
The ADM plan was conceived by A.A. Bienfait, J. Boissevain, P.E. Tegelberg and G.A. Tindal. They first had engineers design a plan for a dry dock that could receive the biggest ship that could pass the North Sea lock of the canal. They then asked the municipality for a place to station the dry dock and to build a repair shipyard. For all of this, they had the support of SMN.

The founders then started to raise funding. There would be 400 shares at 1,000 guilders each. They first contracted for 250 shares with SMN, and perhaps others. On 24 July 1877 they then opened the subscription to 150 shares, and 500 bonds of 1,000 guilders. The offer succeeded for the shares, but the public took less shares than expected. Placing the bonds was also problematic. Only 405 bonds were taken, and so the bond offer was extended to the 27th. The extension indeed succeeded in placing the other 95 bonds.

In 1877 there was also a competing plan for a large dry dock in Amsterdam. This was made by C. and J. von Lindern from Alblasserdam, and would also be realized. This might also explain the interest of SMN. If somebody (i.e. Von Lindern) created a suitable dry dock in Amsterdam or at Nieuwediep, the government would no longer allow the use of the navy dry dock at Willemsoord. Such a situation would become very problematic for SMN if the only suitable dry dock at Amsterdam was occupied. The only other Dutch dry dock which was long enough for the SMN ships was Middelburg Drydock.

Amsterdamsche Droogdok Maatschappij was founded by contract on 17 August 1877. Its goal would be to construct or buy, and operate one or more dry docks in Amsterdam. Furthermore to create an establishment for repairing ships, and storing and delivering coal and cargo. Of the 400 shares, major shareholders were: SMN for 270 shares and Koninklijke Nederlandse Stoomboot-Maatschappij for 25 shares. Others had smaller holdings, amongst them the people who took the initiative to found ADM. SMN would have priority use of the dry docks that the company would manage, but would not pay a lower price. The first executive board would consist of: A.A. Bienfait, J. Boissevain, P.E. Tegelberg, and G.A. Tindal. The first board therefore indeed consisted of the founders of the ADM. In late December 1877 they would be joined by Robert D. Crommelin.

Location 

Negotiations with the municipality about a location for the dry dock had started on 22 May 1877. On 23 August the ADM board had made a formal request for a terrain to the city government. ADM first asked for grounds next to the new Willem III Lock, which was denied. The properties committee of the Amsterdam Municipality then proposed a terrain south of the Petroleum storage for a relatively low price. This terrain was refused by ADM, and then Von Lindern showed interest in that terrain. In October the committee offered another terrain to ADM. ADM could buy 120 ares of land just east of the start of the Noordhollandsch Kanaal, on the north side of the IJ Bay. These lands belonged to the municipality and were referred to as 'Buitenvogelwijkslanden', in the eastern part of Volewijk headland. 60 ares of water could be rented to place the floating dry dock. The price for the land would be 72,000 guilders under stipulation that it could only be used for the dry dock and connected activities. Otherwise the price would be 120,000 guilders, i.e. 6 or 10 guilders per centiare. The area of water could be hired for 50 cents an are per year, i.e. 30 guilders a year.

On 22 October ADM stated that it agreed with the location, even though it differed from the one it had asked. However, it wanted to pay no more than 20,000 guilders for the land, and 60 guilders for the water. It also did not want to pay for dredging a channel towards the floating dry dock. The city government then proposed to offer the lands to ADM for 72,000 in a municipal council meeting on 7 November. Some council members wanted to sell the land for 2 guilders a centiare, or 24,000 guilders, because of the interest that Amsterdam had in attracting SMN to the city. This started a discussion in which some argued that if Amsterdam wanted to subsidize ADM in order to attract SMN, this should be done by other means, because the lower price would depreciate all grounds in the surroundings. In the end, the council lowered the price to 24,000 guilders. On 9 January 1878 the conditions of the deal were confirmed by the municipal council.

Koninginnedok is acquired 
On 8 January 1878 ADM tendered the construction of its first dry dock. It was to be a floating iron dry dock for merchant and navy ships. The design was made by engineers of John Elder & Co. Shipyard. It was to be 400 English feet (122 m) long, and capable of lifting 4,000 tons. It would consist of two parts that could be used separately. The order was given to Union A.G. from Dortmund, Germany. It had made the second lowest offer for 622,000 guilders, and delivery on 15 January 1879. Union constructed the dry dock on site, for the better part with her own employees brought from Germany. After many parts had been built and launched separately, the dry dock was assembled, and opened by King William III on 26 April 1878. It was then christened Koninginnedok by Queen Emma. On 28 April an attempt to lift the new steamer Prinses Marie failed. However, on 6 May Stad Haarlem of 360 feet and 3,319 ton, or 3,330,900 kg was lifted successfully.

The repair shipyard is constructed 
East of the dry dock, architect Van Gendt designed the repair shipyard. It consisted of workshops with a total size of 57 m by 20 m, and a separate management building 30 steps away from these. The workshops would contain a big and small steam hammer, cutting- and drilling machines, and planers, all steam driven. There would also be copper foundry, as well as all other necessities for modern ship repair. In fact, this repair shipyard would be a reincarnation of Bosch Reitz Shipyard from Den Helder. ADM bought all the inventory of that shipyard, and by laying out the new shipyard according to the same plan, all machines could be re-used without changing the line shafts and belts. Actually placing the machines would be done after the dry dock was ready.

Operation

First years (1879-1884) 
On 6 May 1879 ADM was in regular business with the docking of the steamer Stad Haarlem. On 20 May 1879 it held its first general shareholders meeting at the offices of the SMN. In the first year ADM serviced 38 ships in the dry dock for 115 days. It bought a so-called for small repairs, and was able to pay 2.5% dividend. In 1880 Koninginnedok was a bit more busy, and the Vijzeldok also had some business. Dividend over 1880 was 7.925%. SMN then offered 100 of her shares at 110% on 10 May 1881, which were sold. ADM also asked the municipality to buy 7.2 ares more land. In 1881 the dry dock was occupied about 90% of the year, and dividend was 7.99%. That year the dry dock also served 29 inland steam vessels. Over 1882 dividend was 9%.

Without competition (1884-1897) 

1883 and 1884 were good years for ADM, with the dry dock in use for 355 and 347 days. On 17 October 1884 ADM then bought NMSD, the dry dock company of Von Lindern. In November 1884 ADM asked the municipality of Amsterdam to buy grounds south of Koninginnedok in order to place a second dry dock. ADM raised 300,000 guilders in bonds to pay for Von Lindern. The dry dock of Von Lindern was then renamed Koningsdok.

ADM paid a dividend of 9% over 1884. The next years saw ADM paying 6-7 % dividend a year, climbing to 9% in the early 1890s. In 1894 and 1895 it was 11%. In 1897 the dividend over 1896 was slightly less at 9%. Meanwhile the small competitor Reederij der Drijvende Droogdokken demolished its Amsterdam Wooden Drydock II in the Westerdok in 1890, and went downhill till it sold its remaining dry docks in 1902.

High profits and bigger dry docks (1897-1914) 

In December 1896 the Great Lock of IJmuiden (then called , now ) was opened. It was 225 m long and 25 m wide. The board of ADM was then authorized by the shareholders to raise a loan for a new, larger dry dock. On 7 September ADM raised a loan of 650,000 guilders at 3.5%. Later in September 1897 ADM then ordered her third dry dock at Nederlandsche Scheepsbouw Maatschappij for about 700,000 guilders. It would be 424 feet (129 m) long, and capable of lifting up to 7,500 tons. On 14 May 1899 this dry dock was taken into use as Wilhelminadok.

In the early twentieth century dividend remained high. In 1901 the municipality of Amsterdam sold a landward strip of 278.8 mm by 20 m to ADM for 11,152 guilders. In 1902 ADM existed 25 years. It then had 370 permanent staff, and regularly employed about 200 others. The company continued to pay high dividends, and so the share price was at 160% in 1907. In February 1909, Koningsdok was moved from its old location (probably the old one west of Willem I Lock) to a new location next to Koninginnedok.

In January 1910 an extraordinary meeting of shareholders authorized the board of ADM to emit bonds for up to 700,000 guilders in order to build yet another floating dry dock. These bonds were indeed offered in March 1910. In 1911 there was a general repositioning of the ADM dry docks. Koningsdok and Koninginnedok were moored next to each other in a kind of harbor. Wilhelminadok took the place of  Koninginnedok, and the fourth dock (Julianadok) would take the place of Wilhelminadok. On 12 May 1911 Julianadok was launched by NSM. It was 139 m long, and could lift ships of 12,000 tons. It was self-docking, consisting of three parts which could be disconnected to dock each other. Already in 1912 ADM made a plan to lengthen Julianadok by buying a fourth section. This would lengthen her to 615 feet (187.5 m), and increase her capacity to 16,000 tons. This option had been thought of in the design, and was used because several shipping lines had announced longer ships.

In late 1912 ADM had four dry docks, a terrain of 80,000 m2, and workshops of 11,000 m2. Just like Juliandok was to be lengthened, the terrains and workshops would also be expanded. Nevertheless, there were still only 400 shares in ADM, and its open bonds amounted to 860,000 guilders. Therefore ADM offered 200 new shares at 150% on 6 January 1913. Of course with preference for the existing shareholders, at one share for each two a shareholder had. As could be expected, most shareholders used their right of preference, and so there were only a few new shareholders. In January 1913 construction of a boiler factory ) started. In July 1913 ADM bought the last 7,300 m2 of open terrain available to expand the shipyard, east of the Valkenweg. This ground would allow ADM to build a 'harbor', and to moor Wilhelminadok there. Julianadok would then be the only dry dock moored on the IJ.

World War I 
World War I was a very good time for the Dutch shipping industry, but this applied especially to shipbuilding. For ADM the first years seemed little different from before the war. However, ADM was not immune to the downturn in the second half of the war.

Interwar period 
At the start of the interwar period, Dutch industry was in a good position. By 1920 ADM was reserving money to build a fifth dry dock, which was ordered at NSM on 1 August 1921. This dry dock would be named Prins Hendrikdok,  was 650 by 130 by 56 feet, and would have a lift capacity of 25,000 tons. The boiler factory was also expanded, and a factory for sheet metal and metal frames was built. The depression of 1920–1921 hit the Dutch industry somewhat later, but in 1922 ADM fired all loose laborers, and cut wages by 6%.

When the new dry dock was taken into use in January 1925, ADM asked for a new terrain. This would be a lease of 116,500 m2 on the Zijkanaal naar Nieuwendam (see 1905 map). The terrain would be used for the new dock and related activities. Meanwhile business was not good, and ADM twice cut wages by 5% in 1925 There was also no dividend over 1925, for the first time in 48 years. When RDM in Rotterdam had been working overtime, and did pay dividend, there were some questions.

In 1926-1929 results were better, even though the dry docks were not always occupied. In 1928 part of Julianadok was sent to Wieringen to serve there. In 1929 utilization was better, but prices for repair continued to be low. When the Great Depression started in 1929, affairs became worse. Over 1930, 1931 and 1932 there was no dividend. In December 1932 there was a notable job for ADM, when Prins Hendrikdok lifted the wreck of MS Pieter Corneliszoon Hooft in order to close all leaks.

In 1933 the situation became very worrying. Only 237 ships of 629,974 tons visited the dry docks, and the company made a loss before depreciation. This was repeated in 1934 and 1935. After the guilder had been devaluated, ADM made an operational profit in 1936, but this was all used for depreciation. Over 1937 ADM resumed dividend at 10%. In June 1938 ADM then offered 600 shares of 1,000 guilders at 117.5% to the regular shareholders. In August 1938 ADM sold Julianadok to a company from the Free City of Danzig, whence it was quickly towed. The idea was that this gave additional funds to modernize the other docks, especially Prins Hendrikdok. 1938 and 1939 were profitable years, but a lot of profit had to be used for depreciations which had not taken place earlier.

World War II 
Despite of the German occupation of the Netherlands in May 1940, the first year of the war were almost business as usual for ADM. In 1940, 1941, 1942 and 1943 ADM made regular profits, and paid nice dividends. After D-Day things changed. In September 1944 the cranes and dry docks of ADM were destroyed. Later, it proved that several dry docks were relatively undamaged, but Prins Hendrikdok had been utterly ruined by blowing it up with a ship inside. Furthermore, almost all onshore facilities of ADM were heavily damaged.

Post World War II 
The first years after World War II saw a lot of attention to resurfacing and repairing Prins Hendrikdok. Nevertheless ADM was already profitable again in 1947. In 1950 the repaired Prins Hendrikdok was almost continuously occupied, and so ADM returned to paying high dividends. By 1953 the bonanza was over, but the shipping industry was still doing good business.

From 1950 till 1965 ADM also built new ships. Because ADM did not have slipways, this was done by building sections. These were assembled in dry dock 2, and then launched by lowering the dry dock. From the fact that this was done in dry dock 2, one can deduce that this pertained to relatively small ships. However, working on new ships when demand for repairs was low, was a very effective way to operate a repair shipyard.

Second location 
In 1958 ADM announced it would construct a second 'shipyard' at a new location in Amsterdam West. In 1959 AMD announced it would ask investors for 2,9 million guilders to build the new shipyard. On the terrain of 42 hectares a large factory and office were built, while a pier was constructed on the waterside. For this  (Western Harbor Shipyard) a new dry dock 5 was built by ADM itself. The old shipyard was then renamed  (northern shipyard). Werf Westhaven was completed in 1965.

Downturn

Last profitable years (1963-1974) 
In 1963 the downturn in ADM's business became palpable. In 1964 the construction of new ships led to serious losses, and so shipbuilding was stopped. In 1965 the repair business was profitable, but the labor cost per hour in 1965 was double that of 1960. Turnover in non-shipping business grew from 2% in 1964 to 10% in 1965. Profit grew again in 1966. In 1967 business was again good, but productivity did not grow fast enough in respect to increased wages, and so profits decreased. In 1968 and 1969 the generally positive situation in ship repairs continued. In 1970 ADM had a very good year with a 20% increase in turnover. 1971 saw another 25% increase in turnover. In 1972 ADM still had a small profit of 765,000 guilders. In 1973 there was a loss of 324,000 guilders. In 1974 there was again a profit of 2.2 million guilders.

To Ruin (1975-1978) 
In 1975 there was a sudden catastrophic operational loss of 6.5 million guilders. In 1976 there was again a profit, but also a reorganization plan of 3 million. In 1977 there was another big loss of 9.9 million guilders. That year, staff decreased from 1,337 to 984. Meanwhile ADM was concentrating its activities on the old location.

Forced Merger (1978) 

In early 1978 shipyard NDSM of 3,000 employees was in very serious trouble. The government and Rijn-Schelde-Verolme, the very large shipyard and holding which owned NDSM then thought of a plan to merge the repair activities of NDSM and ADM in a new company. ADM had already reorganized, and did not like this idea for merger with a weaker partner. By March 1978, the merger of the repair activities of both companies, and the end of shipbuilding at NDSM was government policy. The board of ADM had not been consulted about the merger idea. Worse, it had not even received an official message.

When ADM was consulted, a plan to create a new company on the grounds of NDSM was made. ADM demanded that all her staff would be employed by the new company, that the terrains owned by ADM would not become part of the new company, and that the government paid an unspecified subsidy. On 27 September 1978 there was a final agreement to merge the repair activities in a new company ADM BV under direction of ADM. The government participated for 14 million, and gave 25 million to cover initial losses. A small shipyard for shipbuilding (Nederlandse Scheepsbouw Maatschappij BV) was also set up, and would also be managed by ADM. The grounds of ADM remained with ADM holding, which also had a 53% share in ADM BV.

Towards bankruptcy (1979-1985) 
By early 1980 ADM BV had spent almost all available  money. ADM holding had better options, because of the grounds she owned. By 1982 the government again had to intervene to keep ADM BV in business. By early 1985 the situation was desperate. On 4 January 1985 ADM asked for an automatic stay, on 17 January ADM BV filed for bankruptcy.

Aftermath

ADM Naval Services (ANS) (1985-1988) 
After bankruptcy had been declared, a small company called ADM Naval Services (ANS) was founded. It had the specific purpose of modernizing the old cruiser Almirante Grau of the Peruvian navy. About 150 former employees worked for this company till this project was finished. Meanwhile plans to restart ADM BV came to nothing. In November 1986 the inventory of ADM was auctioned. On 22 January 1988 Almirante Grau left for Peru after work had been finished.

Squatters Community Westhaven 
The former shipyard Westhaven was squatted in 1987, and cleared in 1992. In 1997 the terrain was sold to Bertus Lüske, and squatted again. Now squatters realized a kind of community like Freetown Christiania in Copenhagen. In July 2018 the Council of State judged the presence of the squatters illegal, and the last of them was evicted by force in January 2019.

References

Notes

Defunct companies of the Netherlands
Shipbuilding companies of the Netherlands